
The Northern Inuit Dog, along with its offshoot breed lines the Tamaskan dog, the British Timber dog and the Utonagan, is a breed of dog developed from a 1980s breeding project in the United Kingdom with the objective of producing a dog breed that resembles wolves.

History

Northern Inuit Dogs descend from dogs of unknown breed ancestry imported from North America in the 1980s that were crossed with Alaskan Malamutes, German Shepherds, Siberian Huskies and possibly Samoyeds; the intention of the breeding project was to create a dog of wolf-like appearance that could be kept as a companion dog and that could also be trained for other tasks.

The Northern Inuit Dog breeding project subsequently split into a number of breed lines, including the Tamaskan dog, the British Timber dog and the Utonagan.

Appearance

The Northern Inuit Dog is a medium to large breed of dog, with the males larger and heavier than the females. They have thick coats of varying color. The ears are upright, with the muzzle and skull usually the same length. They have straight, furry tails.

Character

Northern Inuit Dogs are often confident and friendly. Their good-tempered nature has led to them being  used as therapy dogs. They enjoy human company, and sometimes develop separation anxiety. They bond quickly. Their trusting nature is known to make them bad guard dogs. They are good with children, but they should be supervised while near kids, due to their strength and size. They are known to howl. They are very intelligent, and bore quickly, leading to them being hard to train. They are also quite sensitive. The breed is known to chase small, swift animals, like squirrels.

Health

The breed is a very healthy breed, with dogs often living for twelve to fifteen years. However, Northern Inuit Dogs are known to develop elbow and hip dysplasia, a condition where their joints do not form properly, leading to pain and lameness later in life. They can also develop achondroplasia, cryptorchidism, and degenerative myelopathy.

Northern Inuit Society

The Northern Inuit Society, founded in the early 1990s, exists to govern the wellbeing of the Northern Inuit Dog, as well as the breeding. It is currently the Northern Inuit Dog’s only governing body. It also holds the complete pedigree database for the breed. All Northern Inuit Dogs are tested before breeding. The Northern Inuit Society does not approve of mixing the breed with other dogs.

In popular culture
Northern Inuit dogs were used in the filming of the television series Game of Thrones to portray dire wolves.

A Tamaskan dog played a wolf in a 2016 Broadway production of The Crucible.

A Tamaskan has been the live mascot for the NC State Wolfpack since 2010, appearing on the sidelines of football games, bowl games, and other football and men’s basketball events.

See also
 Dogs portal
 List of dog breeds
 Siberian Husky

References

https://www.dogzone.com/breeds/northern-inuit-dog/

https://www.nisociety.net/

External links
 Northern Inuit Society - governing body of the Northern Inuit dog breed

Companion dogs
Dog breeds originating in England